The 1976 All-Big Eight Conference football team consists of American football players chosen by various organizations for All-Big Eight Conference teams for the 1976 NCAA Division I football season.  The selectors for the 1976 season included the Associated Press (AP).

Offensive selections

Quarterbacks
 Vince Ferragamo, Nebraska (AP)

Running backs
 Terry Miller, Oklahoma State (AP)
 Tony Reed, Colorado (AP)

Tight ends
 Derrel Gofourth, Oklahoma State (AP)

Centers
 Rik Bonness, Nebraska (AP)

Offensive guards
 Dave Greenwood, Iowa State (AP)
 Dan Schmidt, Nebraska (AP)

Offensive tackles
 Mike Vaughan, Oklahoma (AP)
 Bob Lingenfelter, Nebraska (AP)

Wide receivers
 Luther Blue, Iowa State (AP)
 Joe Stewart, Missouri (AP)

Kicker
 Abby Daigle, Oklahoma State (AP)

Defensive selections

Defensive ends
 Ray Phillips, Nebraska (AP)
 Daria Butler, Oklahoma State (AP)

Defensive tackles
 Phillip Dokes, Oklahoma State (AP)
 Mike Fultz, Nebraska (AP)

Middle guards
 Charlie Johnson, Colorado (AP)

Linebackers
 Clete Phillen, Nebraska (AP)
 Darryl Hunt, Oklahoma (AP)

Defensive backs
 Zac Henderson, Oklahoma (AP)
 Scott Hill, Oklahoma (AP)
 Mike Spivey, Colorado (AP)
 Dave Butterfield, Nebraska (AP)

Key

AP = Associated Press

See also
 1976 College Football All-America Team

References

All-Big Seven Conference football team
All-Big Eight Conference football teams